Bad Man from Red Butte is a 1940 American Western film directed by Ray Taylor and written by Sam Robins. The film stars Johnny Mack Brown, Bob Baker, Fuzzy Knight, Anne Gwynne, Bill Cody Jr. and Norman Willis. It was released on June 1, 1940 by Universal Pictures.

Plot

Cast        
Johnny Mack Brown as Gils Brady / Buck Halliday
Bob Baker as Gabriel Hornsby
Fuzzy Knight as Spud Jenkins
Anne Gwynne as Tibby Mason
Bill Cody Jr. as Skip Toddhunter
Norman Willis as Hal Benson
Earle Hodgins as Hiram T. Cochran
Roy Barcroft as Hank
Lafe McKee as Dan Toddhunter
Lloyd Ingraham as Turner 
Buck Moulton as Jitters
Mira McKinney as Miss Woods

References

External links
 

1940 films
American Western (genre) films
1940 Western (genre) films
Universal Pictures films
Films directed by Ray Taylor
American black-and-white films
1940s English-language films
1940s American films